Badjan (also Romanized as Bādjān and Bādejān; also known as Bādejān-e Varzaq, Bādgūn, Bādījān, and Bādjān-e Varzaq) is a village in Varzaq Rural District, in the Central District of Faridan County, Isfahan Province, Iran. At the 2006 census, its population was 2,251, in 582 families.

References 

Populated places in Faridan County